The eschatology of Jehovah's Witnesses is central to their religious beliefs. They believe that Jesus Christ has been ruling in heaven as king since 1914, a date they believe was prophesied in Scripture, and that after that time a period of cleansing occurred, resulting in God's selection of the Bible Students associated with Charles Taze Russell to be his people in 1919. They believe the destruction of those who reject their message and thus willfully refuse to obey God will shortly take place at Armageddon, ensuring that the beginning of the new earthly society will be composed of willing subjects of that kingdom.

The group's doctrines surrounding 1914 are the legacy of a series of emphatic claims regarding the years 1799, 1874, 1878, 1914, 1918 and 1925 made in the Watch Tower Society's publications between 1879 and 1924. Claims about the significance of those years, including the presence of Jesus Christ, the beginning of the "last days", the destruction of worldly governments and the earthly resurrection of Jewish patriarchs, were successively abandoned. In 1922 the society's principal journal, Watch Tower, described its chronology as "no stronger than its weakest link", but also claimed the chronological relationships to be "of divine origin and divinely corroborated...in a class by itself, absolutely and unqualifiedly correct" and "indisputable facts", while repudiation of Russell's teachings was described as "equivalent to a repudiation of the Lord".

The Watch Tower Society has stated that its early leaders promoted "incomplete, even inaccurate concepts". The Governing Body of Jehovah's Witnesses says that, unlike Old Testament prophets, its interpretations of the Bible are not inspired or infallible. Witness publications say that Bible prophecies can be fully understood only after their fulfillment, citing examples of biblical figures who did not understand the meaning of prophecies they received. Watch Tower publications often cite Proverbs 4:18, "The path of the righteous ones is like the bright light that is getting lighter and lighter until the day is firmly established" (NWT) to support their view that there would be an increase in knowledge during "the time of the end", as mentioned in Daniel 12:4. Jehovah's Witnesses state that this increase in knowledge needs adjustments. Watch Tower publications also say that unfulfilled expectations are partly due to eagerness for God's Kingdom and that they do not call their core beliefs into question.

Current beliefs
Jehovah's Witnesses teach the imminent end of the current world society, or "system of things" by God's judgment, leading to deliverance for the saved. This judgment will begin with false religion, which they identify as the "harlot", Babylon the Great, referred to in the Book of Revelation. They apply this designation to all other religions. They do not currently place their expectations on any specific date, but believe that various events will lead up to the end of this "system of things", culminating in Armageddon. Armageddon is understood to include the destruction of all earthly governments by God. After Armageddon, God will extend his heavenly kingdom to include earth.

They believe that after Armageddon, based on scriptures such as John 5:28, 29, the dead will gradually be resurrected to a "day of judgment" lasting for a thousand years. This judgment will be based on their actions after resurrection, not on past deeds. At the end of the thousand years a final test will take place when Satan is brought back to mislead perfect mankind. The result will be a fully tested, glorified human race.

Presence of Jesus Christ
Watch Tower Society publications teach that Jesus Christ returned invisibly and began to rule in heaven as king in October 1914. They state that the beginning of Christ's heavenly rule would seem worse initially for mankind because it starts with the casting out of Satan from heaven to the earth, which according to Revelation 12, would bring a brief period of "woe" to mankind. This woe will be reversed when Christ comes to destroy Satan's earthly organization, throwing Satan into the abyss and extending God's kingdom rule over the earth, over which Jesus reigns as God's appointed king. They believe the Greek word parousia, usually translated as "coming", is more accurately understood as an extended invisible "presence", perceived only by a series of "signs".

Witnesses base their beliefs about the significance of 1914 on the Watch Tower Society's interpretation of biblical chronology, which is hinged on their assertion that the Babylonian captivity and destruction of Jerusalem occurred in 607 BC. From this, they conclude that Daniel chapter 4 prophesied a period of 2,520 years, from 607 BC until 1914. They equate this period with the "Gentile Times" or "the appointed times of the nations," a phrase taken from Luke 21:24.

They believe that when the Babylonians conquered Jerusalem, the line of kings descended from David was interrupted, and that God's throne was "trampled on" from then until Jesus began ruling in October 1914. Secular historians date the event of Jerusalem's destruction to within a year of 587 BC. The Witnesses' alternative chronology produces a 20-year gap between the reigns of Neo-Babylonian Kings Amel-Marduk (rule ended 560 BC) and Nabonidus (rule began 555 BC) in addition to the intervening reigns of Neriglissar and Labashi-Marduk, despite the availability of contiguous cuneiform records.

They teach that after the war of Armageddon, Jesus will rule over earth as king for 1,000 years, after which he will hand all authority back to Jehovah.

Sign of "last days"
Jehovah's Witnesses teach that since October 1914, humanity has been living in a period of intense increased trouble known as "the last days", marked by war, disease, famine, earthquakes, and a progressive degeneration of morality. They believe their preaching is part of the sign, often alluding to the text of Matthew 24:14, "And this gospel of the kingdom shall be proclaimed in all the world as a witness to all nations. And then the end shall come." (MKJV) 

They claim that various calamities in the modern world constitute proof of these beliefs, such as the outbreak of World War I in August 1914, the Spanish flu epidemic in May 1918, the onset of World War II in 1939, the terrorist attacks of September 11, 2001 and, more recently, the COVID-19 pandemic.

Judgment of religion
Jehovah's Witnesses believe that in 1918, Christ judged all world religions claiming to be Christian, and that after a period of eighteen months, among all groups and religions claiming to represent Christ, only the "Bible Students", from which Jehovah's Witnesses developed, met God's approval. Watch Tower Society publications claim that the world's other religions have misrepresented God, and filled the world with hatred. They identify "Babylon The Great" and the "mother of the harlots" referred to in Revelation 17:3–6 as the "world empire of false religion"

During the final great tribulation, all other religions will be destroyed by "crazed" member governments of the United Nations, acting under the direction of Jehovah. Witness publications identify the United Nations as the "beast" to whom the "ten kings" of Revelation 17:12,13 give their "power and authority."

History of eschatology
Watch Tower Society eschatological teachings are based on the earliest writings of Charles Taze Russell, but have undergone significant changes since then. Many of the changes reflect altered views on the significance of the dates 1874, 1914, 1918, and 1925.

Early expectations (1871–1881)
The Second Adventists affiliated with Nelson H. Barbour expected a visible and dramatic return of Christ in 1873, and later in 1874. They agreed with other Adventist groups that the "time of the end", also called the "last days", had started in 1799. Soon after the 1874 disappointment, Barbour's group decided Christ had returned to the earth in 1874, but invisibly. Writing in his journal The Herald of the Morning in 1875, Barbour outlined his eschatological views and connected the years 1874, 1878, 1881, and 1914. The "harvest" was to run from 1874 to the spring of 1878, concluding with "the translation of the living saints into the air."

1881 would mark the restoration of the Jews to Palestine. The period from 1881 until 1914 would see the installation of God's kingdom on earth.
Barbour wrote that in the 40 years from 1874 to 1914 "the 'time of trouble such as never was since there was a nation;' will be fulfilled. And in the mean time, the kingdom of God will be set up, 'break in pieces, and consume all these [Gentile] kingdoms,' 'and the stone become a great mountain, and fill the whole earth,' and usher in glory of the millennial age".

Russell became associated with Barbour in 1876 and accepted Barbour's eschatological understanding. In 1877, Barbour and Russell jointly issued the book Three Worlds and the Harvest of This World, which reiterated Barbour's earlier teachings. It proclaimed Christ's invisible return in 1874, the resurrection of the saints in 1875, and predicted the end of the "harvest" and a rapture of the saints to heaven for 1878 and the
final end of "the day of wrath" in 1914. 1874 was considered the end of 6000 years of human history and the beginning of judgment by Christ.

The selection of 1878 as the year of the rapture of the saints was based on the application of parallel dispensations, which equated the 3½-year period of Christ's ministry with a similar "harvest" period following his parousia. When the rapture failed to occur, Russell admitted they "felt somewhat disappointed", but decided there would be an additional 3½-year period "making the harvest seven years long". Successive issues of The Herald of the Morning identified the autumn of 1881 as the end of the "Harvest" and the likely time for the translation of the Church to heaven. Russell split from Barbour over doctrinal differences and began publishing Zion's Watch Tower in July 1879.

Great Pyramid of Giza (1876–1928)

Influenced by the pyramidology theories of John Taylor and Charles Piazzi Smyth, Nelson Barbour and Charles Russell taught that the Great Pyramid of Giza contained prophetic measurements in "pyramid inches" that pointed to both 1874 and 1914. Russell viewed the Great Pyramid as "God's Stone Witness and Prophet". Smyth reviewed Russell's manuscript on the Great Pyramid before publication. Russell credited him and Scottish writer Robert Menzies for the view "that the Great Pyramid is Jehovah's 'Witness', and that it was as important a witness to divine truth as to natural science." 

Prophetic dates derived from the measurements inside the Great Pyramid were seen as complementary to biblical interpretations. Russell included the Great Pyramid as part of his film and color slide production The Photo-Drama of Creation in 1914, suggesting that the Great Pyramid was built by the Old Testament king-priest Melchizedek. A special edition of the first volume of Studies in the Scriptures was also published, which was re-titled The Divine Plan of the Ages and the Corroborative Testimony of the Great Pyramid.

Russell's interpretations of the Great Pyramid were supported by the writings of John and Morton Edgar who were prominent members of his movement. The Edgars claimed that the revision in measurement and change in date was a result of errors made by Smyth.

In the early 1920s, the significance of the pyramidological predictions for 1914 were re-interpreted to mean that "the old evil order began to pass away in 1914." In 1924, an issue of Golden Age referred to the Great Pyramid as "the Scientific Bible" and added that measurements on the Grand Gallery inside the Great Pyramid confirmed the dates 1874, 1914 and 1925. Similarly, the 1924 publication The Way to Paradise refers to the Great Pyramid as "the Bible in Stone" and concludes:

In 1928, the belief that the Great Pyramid contained a prophetic blueprint of biblical chronology was rejected, and the Pyramid was seen as built "under the direction of Satan the Devil."

"The Time Is At Hand" (1881–1918)
Some of Barbour's eschatology was retained by Russell after they parted company. Basing his interpretations on a concept of parallel "dispensations", Russell taught that while Jesus was invisibly present on earth, he was also made its king in 1878. He believed God had rejected the "nominal Church", considered to be "Babylon the Great", in 1878. Russell taught that in 1878 Christ resurrected all the "dead in Christ" as spirit beings to be with him on earth awaiting a future glorification to heaven. 

The remainder of the 144,000 who would die after 1878 would each be resurrected at the time of their death. Together with Christ on earth, these invisible resurrected spirit beings were said to be engaged in directing a harvest work, running from 1874 to 1914, to gather the remainder of those with the heavenly calling. Russell later moderated his view about the significance of 1881, stating that the "door" for the gathering of the Bride of Christ "stands ajar."

He wrote that the culmination of Armageddon would occur in 1914, preceded by the gathering of all the saints, both resurrected and living, to heaven. Based on measurements from the Great Pyramid of Giza, this "passing beyond the vail" or rapture was expected "before the close of A.D. 1910." Russell enumerated seven expectations for 1914 in The Time is at Hand:
 God's kingdom would take full control of earth "on the ruins of present institutions";
 Christ would be present as earth's new ruler;
 The last of the "royal priesthood, the body of Christ" would be glorified with Christ;
 Jerusalem would no longer "be trodden down by the Gentiles";
 "Israel's blindness will begin to be turned away";
 The great "time of trouble" would reach its culmination of worldwide anarchy;
 God's Kingdom would "smite and crush the Gentile image—and fully consume the power of these kings".

In 1911, Russell wrote that October 1914 would witness the "full end" of Babylon, or nominal Christianity, "utterly destroyed as a system". At first, the hopes for 1914 were stretched to "near the end of A.D. 1915." A few months before his death in October 1916, Russell wrote: "We believe that the dates have proven to be quite right. We believe that Gentile Times have ended. ... The Lord did not say that the Church would all be glorified by 1914. We merely inferred it, and, evidently, erred." He interpreted the war in Europe to be the first of three phases of Armageddon and the destruction of Christendom to take place in 1918.

Following Russell's lead, the book The Finished Mystery emphasized events for 1918. The destruction of the churches of Christendom and the deaths of "church members by the millions" was expected in 1918. The Finished Mystery proposed the spring of 1918 for the glorification of the Church and suggested that it may occur on the day of Passover in that year. First printings of The Finished Mystery predicted the end of the World War "some time about October 1, 1917," but this was changed in subsequent editions. It also predicted the destruction of governments in 1920.

"Millions Now Living Will Never Die!" (1918–1925)
The predictions for 1920 were discarded before that year arrived, in favor of a new chronology. In 1918–1919, Joseph Franklin Rutherford, second president of the Watch Tower Society, inaugurated a worldwide lecture series entitled "Millions Now Living Will Never Die!", later reproduced in booklet form. It provided a re-interpretation of the significance of the year 1914, now seen as the beginning of the "last days". It included new predictions for 1925 including the resurrection of the biblical patriarchs Abraham, Isaac, and Jacob and other Old Testament personages, referred to as "princes". Their return would mark the beginning of a new order, from which time millions of people alive at that time would be able to live forever. Newspaper advertisements for the "Millions" lecture localized the claim, with a typical declaration in a Marion, Ohio newspaper reading: "It will be conclusively proved... that thousands now living in Marion and vicinity will never die."

The book stated that 1925 would be among the dates "stamped with God's approval" and The Watch Tower described the evidence for the chronology surrounding 1925 as stronger than that for 1914, but acknowledged disappointments surrounding earlier predictions and cautioned that "all that some expect to see in 1925 may not transpire that year", and that the expectations could be "a means of testing and sifting." When 1925 also passed uneventfully, meeting attendance among the Bible Students dropped dramatically in some congregations and attendance at the annual Memorial fell from 90,434 to 17,380 between 1925 and 1928.

"Armageddon Immediately Before Us" (1925–1966)

From 1920 until 1930, the Watch Tower Society, under Rutherford's leadership, radically changed much of its chronologies after the failure of these eschatological expectations. In July 1920, the Watch Tower first declared that Christ had been enthroned as king in heaven in 1914, not 1878. A 1927 Watch Tower transferred the timing of the resurrection of the "saints" from 1878 to 1918, explaining that they would be raised as spirit creatures to heavenly life to be with Christ there. 

In 1929, the start of the "Last Days" was changed from 1799 to 1914 and the change of "Christ's Presence" from 1874 to 1914 was first indicated in 1930. Christ's Second Advent was newly explained as a "turning of attention" to the earth, with Christ remaining in heaven—a departure from the earlier teaching of a literal return to earth. The judgment of "Babylon the Great" was changed from 1878 to 1919 with the publication of the book Light in 1930. The teaching that the "great tribulation" had begun in 1914 and was "cut short" in 1918—to be resumed at Armageddon—was discarded in 1969.

In 1930, Rutherford took up residence in a "Spanish mansion" in California which he called Beth Sarim, meaning, House of the Princes. It was held in trust for the ancient biblical "princes" who were expected to be resurrected immediately prior to Armageddon. Rutherford spent the winter months at Beth Sarim and died there in January, 1942. The belief that Old Testament "princes" would be resurrected before Armageddon was abandoned in 1950.

In the mid-1930s and early 1940s, Watch Tower Society publications placed emphasis on the imminence of Armageddon, said to be "months" away and "immediately before us." Publications urged converts to remain single and childless because it was "immediately before Armageddon." Young Witnesses were counseled in 1943: "It is better and wiser for those of the Lord's 'other sheep' who hope to survive Armageddon and be given the divine mandate to fill the earth with a righteous offspring to defer matters until after the tribulation and destruction of Armageddon is past." This view was discarded in 1950.

"Looking Forward to 1975" (1966–1975)

During the 1960s and early 1970s, Witnesses were instructed by means of articles in their literature and at their assemblies that Armageddon and Christ's thousand-year millennial reign could begin by 1975. Strong statements for 1975 appeared, sometimes accompanied with cautionary remarks. The booklet The Approaching Peace of a Thousand Years, which was the text of the keynote address to major assemblies of Jehovah's Witnesses throughout the world in 1969, stated about that promised reign (which would begin at "God's fixed time"):

In 1968, a Watchtower article asked: "Why Are You Looking Forward to 1975?":

Young Witnesses were advised in 1969 to avoid careers requiring lengthy periods of schooling and a 1974 issue of the Kingdom Ministry newsletter commended Witnesses who had sold their homes and property to engage in full-time preaching, adding: "Certainly this is a fine way to spend the short time remaining before the wicked world's end."

In a lecture in early 1975, then vice president Fred Franz selected sundown on September 5, 1975, as the end of 6000 years of human history, but cautioned that although the prophecies "could happen" by then, it looked improbable. After 1975 passed without any sign of the expected paradise, The Watchtower described as "unwise" the actions of some Witnesses who had made radical changes in their lives, commenting: "It may be that some who have been serving God have planned their lives according to a mistaken view of just what was to happen on a certain date or in a certain year. They may have, for this reason, put off or neglected things that they otherwise would have cared for ... But it is not advisable for us to set our sights on a certain date, neglecting everyday things we would ordinarily care for as Christians, such as things that we and our families really need." In 1979, in a lecture entitled "Choosing the Best Way of Life", the Watch Tower Society acknowledged responsibility for much of the disappointment around 1975. The following year, a Watchtower article admitted that the leaders of Jehovah's Witnesses had erred in "setting dates for the desired liberation from the suffering and troubles that are the lot of persons throughout the earth", and that the Life Everlasting book (1966) had led to "considerable expectation" for 1975, with subsequent statements "that implied that such realization of hopes by that year was more of a probability than a mere possibility." The article added, "It is to be regretted that these latter statements apparently overshadowed the cautionary ones and contributed to a buildup of the expectation already initiated".

Baptism statistics compared with the number of those reporting preaching for 1976–80 showed that many became inactive during that period.

The "generation of 1914" (1976–present)

After the passing of 1975, the Watch Tower Society continued to emphasize the teaching that God would execute his judgment on humankind before the generation of people who had witnessed the events of 1914 had all died. This teaching was based on an interpretation of Matthew 24:34 ("Truly I say to you that this generation will by no means pass away until all these things occur"), with the term "a generation" said to refer "beyond question" to a generation living in a given period.

The term had been used with regard to the nearness of Armageddon from the 1940s, when the view was that "a generation" covered a period of about 30 to 40 years. As the 40-year deadline passed without Armageddon occurring, the definition of "a generation" underwent a series of changes: in 1952 it was said for the first time to mean an entire lifetime, possibly 80 years or more; in 1968 it was applied to those who had been at least 15 years old in 1914, who were considered to be "old enough to witness with understanding what took place when the 'last days' began" (italics theirs). In 1980 the starting date for that "generation" was brought into the 20th century when the term was applied to those who had been born in 1904 and therefore aged 10 and able simply "to observe" when World War I had begun. The Watchtower commented: "The fact that their number is dwindling is one more indication that 'the conclusion of the system of things' is moving fast toward its end."

From 1982 to 1995, the inside cover of Awake! magazine included, in its mission statement, a reference to the "generation of 1914", alluding to "the Creator's promise ... of a peaceful and secure new world before the generation that saw the events of 1914 passes away." In 1985, Witnesses were reminded: "The 1914 generation is well into the evening of its existence, thus allowing only little time for this prophecy yet to be fulfilled.".

Former Governing Body member Raymond Franz claimed members of the Governing Body of Jehovah's Witnesses debated replacing the doctrine with a markedly different interpretation and that in 1980 Albert Schroeder, Karl Klein and Grant Suiter proposed moving the beginning of the "generation" to the year 1957, to coincide with the year Sputnik was launched. He said the proposal was rejected by the rest of the Governing Body.

Despite its earlier description as being "beyond question", the "generation of 1914" teaching was discarded in 1995. Rather than a literal lifespan of 70 to 80 years, the definition of "generation" was changed to "contemporary people of a certain historical period, with their identifying characteristics," without reference to any specific amount of time. This class of people was described as "the peoples of earth who see the sign of Christ's presence but fail to mend their ways". Mention of 1914 was dropped from Awake! magazine's mission statement as of November 8, 1995. The Watchtower insisted, however, that Armageddon was still imminent, asking: "Does our more precise viewpoint on 'this generation' mean that Armageddon is further away than we had thought? Not at all!"

In 2008, the "generation" teaching was again altered, and the term was used to refer to the "anointed" believers, some of whom would still be alive on earth when the great tribulation begins. This was a return to a belief previously held between 1927  and 1950 when the teaching of the "generation of 1914" not passing away was adopted.

In 2010, the teaching of the "generation" was modified again, to refer to "the anointed who were on hand when the sign began to become evident in 1914" and other "anointed" members whose lives "overlap" with the first group. In 2015, it was asserted that the "generation" would include any individuals "anointed" up until 1992 at the earliest.

Controversy

Fall of Jerusalem

Jehovah's Witnesses assert that Jerusalem was destroyed by the Babylonians in 607 BC and completely uninhabited for exactly seventy years. This date is critical to their selection of October 1914 for the arrival of Christ in kingly power—2520 years after October 607 BC. Non-Witness scholars do not support 607 BC for the event; most scholars date the destruction of Jerusalem to within a year of 587 BC, twenty years later. Jehovah's Witnesses believe that periods of seventy years mentioned in the books of Jeremiah and Daniel refer to the Babylonian exile of Jews. They also believe that the gathering of Jews in Jerusalem, shortly after their return from Babylon, officially ended the exile in Jewish month of Tishrei (Ezra 3:1). According to the Watch Tower Society, October 607 BC is derived by counting back seventy years from Tishrei of 537 BC, based on their belief that Cyrus' decree to release the Jews during his first regnal year "may have been made in late 538 B.C. or before March 4–5, 537 B.C." Non-Witness sources assign the return to either 538 BC or 537 BC.

In The Gentile Times Reconsidered: Chronology & Christ's Return, Carl O. Jonsson, a former Witness, presents eighteen lines of evidence to support the traditional view of neo-Babylonian chronology. He accuses the Watch Tower Society of deliberately misquoting sources in an effort to bolster their position. The Watch Tower Society claims that biblical chronology is not always compatible with secular sources, and that the Bible is superior. It claims that secular historians make conclusions about 587 BC based on incorrect or inconsistent historical records, but accepts those sources that identify Cyrus' capture of Babylon in 539 BC, claiming it has no evidence of being inconsistent and hence can be used as a pivotal date.

In 2003, Rolf Furuli—a lecturer in Semitic languages and a member of the denomination at the time—presented a study of 607 BC in support of the Witnesses' conclusions in Assyrian, Babylonian, Egyptian, and Persian Chronology Compared with the Chronology of the Bible, Volume 1: Persian Chronology and the Length of the Babylonian Exile of the Jews. Lester L. Grabbe, professor of theology at the University of Hull, said of Furuli's study: "Once again we have an amateur who wants to rewrite scholarship. ... F. shows little evidence of having put his theories to the test with specialists in Mesopotamian astronomy and Persian history."

See also

 Unfulfilled Watch Tower Society predictions

References

Bibliography
Apocalypse Delayed: The Story of Jehovah's Witnesses by M. James Penton, professor emeritus in the Department of History at the University of Lethbridge and former Jehovah's Witness 

Apocalypticism
Beliefs and practices of Jehovah's Witnesses
Jehovah's Witnesses